Antonio Circignani (1560–1620) was an Italian painter of the late-Renaissance (Mannerism) period and early Baroque. Born in Pomarance, he is known also as Antonio Pomarancio. He was the son of the painter Niccolò Circignani, and with his father, who died in 1588, he worked in Rome. He was featured in the Vite published by Giovanni Baglione.

One of his most famous paintings, Wedding of the Virgin, is found in the Saint Mary of Angels Basilica in Assisi, Italy.

Works
Other works include a Four Evangelists (Quattro Evengalisti), in Museo di San Francesco, San Marino; and Trinity, in Chiesa della Santissima Trinità, Foiano della Chiana.

Gallery

Sources

1560 births
1620 deaths
16th-century Italian painters
Italian male painters
17th-century Italian painters
Italian Renaissance painters
People from  Pomarance